Timothy Wetjen  (born ) is an English rugby union footballer.

Wetjen was born in Canterbury on 3 December 1991. He is a youth player at Maidstone Rugby Club but had been being pushed through the ranks. He has been trialled with professional side London Wasps in the 2008-2009 Season. He broke onto the International 7s scene in 2007 with the District squads around the London & SE sector. He suffered neck and back injuries in the 2006 season however battled back to fitness and under the wing of Pete Barford forced his way into the public eye once again.

Honours

- Kent Cup Finalist
- East Coast Challenge Cup Champion 2008
- London Wasps Trialist
- Accepted to Worcester Warriors Academy 2009

References

1991 births
Living people
English rugby union players
Rugby union players from Canterbury
Worcester Warriors players